Boqor Burhan Boqor Musse, is the titular title of Boqor Burhan, the heir apparent of the Majeerteen Sultanate. In May 2014, he was inaugurated as the 34th majeerteen King. His inauguration was attended by officials from Puntland, Federal Government of Somalia, Jubaland, Kenya and the Somali administration of Ethiopia.  In 2016, the delegations from Somali clans in Somalia, Djibouti, Ethiopia and Kenya are attending the three-day summit organized by King Burhan Musa, the 34th king of Daarood kingdom. It is the first such gathering for the Somali traditional leaders since the start of the Somali civil war in 1991.

References

21st-century Somalian people
Lines of succession
Living people
Majeerteen Sultanate
Year of birth missing (living people)